StarStruck is a Philippine television reality talent competition show broadcast by GMA Network. Originally hosted by Dingdong Dantes and Nancy Castiglione, it premiered on October 27, 2003 on the network's Telebabad line up. The show has aired seven seasons and 538 episodes. Dantes and Jennylyn Mercado served as the hosts for the show's most recent season.

Format

Across the Philippines, casting tours are held in different regions, wherein hopeful contestants are screened by preliminary panels to be selected for star quality, acting talent, or humorous potential and human interest. The audition process is long, beginning with thousands of hopefuls showcasing their talents and being interviewed by the panelists.

The competition advances when 14 contestants are left for a respective season. During the finals, the finalists were eliminated one by one until three pairs remain. After two weeks, one pair will be eliminated. The remaining four advances to the Final Judgment where the winners are proclaimed.

The format gains some tweaks depending on the show's production. The fourth season is noted to have six finalists instead of the usual "final four" in determining the ultimate winners; on the other hand, the fifth season chose five finalists.

The Final Judgment will award the finalists' respective titles. There are two Ultimate Survivors— male and female–as the season concludes. Winners are determined by averaging the amasses text and online votes, plus the decision of the StarStruck Council which comprises three members. With the exception of the fourth season, the Ultimate Male Survivor and Ultimate Female Survivor titles were given once again.

Overview

After the first season of StarStruck aired in 2003, the succeeding seasons had many twists and changes, including different elimination formats and even the number of winners, and to determine the Ultimate Male Survivor and Ultimate Female Survivor titles.

In the second season, which aired in 2004, the host announced the names of safe finalists one by one, until the eliminated finalist remained on stage to take the final bow. This was a deviation from the first season where the host would call the bottom group.

Also in the second season, two changes were introduced: Pre-recognition Awardee, where the top-ranking finalist got a cash prize; and Wild Card, where an eliminated finalist was able to return to the show and compete against the remaining finalist.

The third season aired in 2005, and was dubbed "The Nationwide Invasion" as StarStruck brought the search all over the Philippines.

It also introduced a winning title called the "Ultimate Sole Survivor". The season still hailed an Ultimate Male Survivor and Ultimate Female Survivor. Of the two, the one who scored higher won the Ultimate Sole Survivor title and got an additional cash prize. The two runner-ups were called First Prince and First Princess.

In 2006, StarStrucks fourth season was dubbed "The Next Level" and had four winners for the new titles Ultimate Love Team, Ultimate Hunk and Ultimate Sweetheart titles and got an additional cash prize. Additionally, two changes were introduced: The Final 20 gave finalists an exciting twist instead of the Final 14; and Wild Card, where an eliminated the two finalists were able to return to the show and completed the Danger 8 survivors.

The fifth season of StarStruck aired in 2009, and was dubbed StarStruck V. It introduced a twist called The Factor Five, where special powers were given to the council and the viewer's so they could save or vote out a particular finalists, and instead of the two first runner-ups, they are three, and the second runner-up called a Second Prince.

The sixth season, which aired in 2015, had two sets of Final 14: the Dream 14 and the Believe 14. From there, the show determined who among the hopefuls would be part of the new Ultimate Final 14.

The current season follows a different format from past editions. In this season, two twists were introduced. In The Second Chance Challenge, after the two hopefuls of the original The Final 14 were eliminated, from the Final Auditions of the Top 22 finalists, one male and one female were able to return to the show and complete the new set of The Ultimate Final 14. In The Last Chance Challenge, the two hopefuls who got the lowest combined scores, compete against next week's bottom two performers for a spot in the Final 8. From this, the council will then choose two hopefuls (one per gender) to save to advance in the completion.

Similar to singing competitions, the finalists are in a studio. They face the judges and get instant feedback after their performances are shown to the public.

Unlike previous seasons that featured a test of artistic skill such as dancing, singing, acting, hosting, and personality development, this season focuses on the survivors' acting skills.

The survivors got through the acting test in different genres and formats: by group, by pair or individually. Each of the survivors faces the council, who are tasked to give instant feedback and scores based on the finalists' performances.

The StarStruck council of this season also has a different role from the predecessors as their voices can now be heard more frequently throughout the show.

In previous seasons, the council only gave their comments before each elimination round, and their scores remained under wraps. This season is also more transparent in terms of each finalist's performance rating, since ranking and total scores are announced at the end of each episode. Even then, the percentage of each finalist's score remains the same 50% from the council and 50% from the public votes.

The audience are given more options to vote for their favorite StarStruck finalist, but aside from text votes, they can also vote via Google or StarStrucks official website.

Inside StarStruck aired from Monday to Friday on the show's YouTube channel.

Hosts

 Dingdong Dantes 
 Nancy Castiglione 
 Jolina Magdangal 
 Raymond Gutierrez 
 Carla Abellana 
 Dennis Trillo 
 Megan Young 
 Jennylyn Mercado 

Segment hosts
 Mark Herras 
 LJ Reyes 
 Arci Muñoz 
 Paulo Avelino 
 Miguel Tanfelix 
 Kris Bernal 
 Rocco Nacino 
 Kyline Alcantara

Judges

 Joey de Leon 
 Joyce E. Bernal 
 Ida Henares 
 Christopher de Leon 
 Louie Ignacio 
 Lorna Tolentino 
 Douglas Quijano 
 Floy Quintos 
 Lolit Solis 
 Sunshine Dizon 
 Iza Calzado 
 Jennylyn Mercado 
 Regine Velasquez 
 Dingdong Dantes 
 Heart Evangelista 
 Cherie Gil 
 Jose Manalo

Seasons

Season 1

The first season of StarStruck, premiered on October 27, 2003. Hosted by Dingdong Dantes and Nancy Castiglione, The council was composed of Joey de Leon, Joyce Bernal and Ida Henares. The season ended with 71 episodes on February 1, 2004.

The first ever Ultimate Survivors were Mark Herras of San Pablo City, Laguna as the Ultimate Male Survivor and Jennylyn Mercado of Las Piñas as the Ultimate Female Survivor.

Season 2

The second season of StarStruck, premiered on October 11, 2004. Hosted by Dingdong Dantes with the StarStruck Kids host, Jolina Magdangal, The council was composed of Joey de Leon, Christopher de Leon and Louie Ignacio. There were slight changes made in the council, Joyce Bernal was replaced by  Louie Ignacio. The season ended with 96 episodes on February 20, 2005.

The Ultimate Survivors were Mike Tan of Angono, Rizal as the Ultimate Male Survivor and Ryza Cenon of Gapan, Nueva Ecija as the Ultimate Female Survivor.

Season 3

The third season of StarStruck, aka (StarStruck: The Nationwide Invasion) premiered on November 28, 2005. Hosted by Dingdong Dantes, Jolina Magdangal and Raymond Gutierrez, The council was composed of Joey de Leon, Louie Ignacio and Lorna Tolentino. The season ended with 77 episodes on March 12, 2006.

The Ultimate Survivors were Marky Cielo of Bauko, Mountain Province as the Ultimate Male Survivor and Jackie Rice of Olongapo City, Zambales as the Ultimate Female Survivor and the first ever Ultimate Sole Survivor, won by Marky Cielo.

Season 4

The fourth season of StarStruck, aka (StarStruck: The Next Level) premiered on December 4, 2006. Hosted by Dingdong Dantes, Jolina Magdangal and Raymond Gutierrez, The council was composed of Louie Ignacio, Lorna Tolentino and Douglas Quiano. The season ended with 91 episodes on March 25, 2007.

The newest titles of Ultimate Survivors were won by Jewel Mische of Bocaue, Bulacan as the Ultimate Sweetheart, Aljur Abrenica of Angeles City, Pampanga as the Ultimate Hunk, and Mart Escudero of General Mariano Alvarez, Cavite and Kris Bernal of Quezon City as the Ultimate Loveteam.

Season 5

The fifth season of StarStruck, aka (StarStruck V) premiered on November 15, 2009. Hosted by Raymond Gutierrez, Carla Abellana and Dennis Trillo. Carla Abellana replaced Jolina Magdangal for this season, while Dennis Trillo replaced Dingdong Dantes, as the latter replaced Richard Gomez, who will run as representative of the 4th district of the Province of Leyte as host of the game show Family Feud.

Major changes happened on the show. The regular daily show became a daily update show that focused on the lives of the contestants and their activities and tests on the show. It was hosted by the show's the segment hosts are StarStruck graduates with Mark Herras, LJ Reyes, Arci Muñoz and Paulo Avelino. They serve as StarStruck Shoutout, who is tasked to join the hopefuls as they go through every phase of the competition, it premiered on November 15, 2009. The council was composed of Lolit Solis, Floy Quintos and Iza Calzado act as the members of the council. Sunshine Dizon, was first reported to be part of the council in the place of Iza Calzado but had to turn down the offer due to health problems.

The five mentors are from the Acting mentor; Gina Alajar, Dance mentor; Douglas Nierras, Singing mentor; Jai Sabas-Aracama, Grooming and Make-up mentor; Barbi Chan and the Image mentor; Abbygale Arrenas de Leon. Also featured many fives: The Factor V, The V Mentors, The V Hosts together with Dingdong Dantes and Nancy Castiglione in the Final Judgment day, The Final V, and a 5 million dollars’ worth of prizes for the Ultimate Survivors. The season ended with 99 episodes on February 21, 2010.

The Ultimate Survivors were Steven Silva of Davao City as the Ultimate Male Survivor and
Sarah Lahbati of Dasmariñas, Cavite as the Ultimate Female Survivor.

Season 6

The sixth season of StarStruck, premiered on September 7, 2015. Hosted by Dingdong Dantes and Megan Young, The segment hosts are StarStruck graduates Mark Herras, Miguel Tanfelix, Kris Bernal, and Rocco Nacino, and they serve as journey hosts, who are tasked to join the hopefuls as they go through every phase of the competition. The council was composed of Joey de Leon, Regine Velasquez-Alcasid, Jennylyn Mercado and Dingdong Dantes. The season ended with 76 episodes on December 19, 2015.

The Ultimate Survivors were Migo Adecer of Mandaluyong as the Ultimate Male Survivor and Klea Pineda of Caloocan as the Ultimate Female Survivor.

Season 7

The seventh season of StarStruck, premiered on June 15, 2019. Hosted by Dingdong Dantes and Jennylyn Mercado, and Kyline Alcantara served as host of Inside StarStruck, which airs from Monday to Friday on StarStrucks YouTube channel. The council was composed of Heart Evangelista, Cherie Gil, and Jose Manalo. This season was directed by Monti Parungao and Rommel Gacho. The season ended with 28 episodes on September 15, 2019.

The recent Ultimate Survivors were Shayne Sava of Binangonan, Rizal as the Ultimate Female Survivor and Kim de Leon of Balayan, Batangas as the Ultimate Male Survivor.

Accolades

Notes

References

External links
 
 

 
2003 Philippine television series debuts
Filipino-language television shows
GMA Network original programming
Philippine reality television series